White Shadow or The White Shadow may refer to:

Film and TV
The White Shadow (film), a 1923 British film
The White Shadow (TV series), a 1970s American television series about a school basketball team
White Shadow (film), a 2013 Tanzanian film

Music
 White Shadow (band), an American alternative rock band that formed in 2006
 DJ White Shadow, an American music producer

Songs
 "White Shadow", a song from Peter Gabriel's Peter Gabriel (1978 album)

Other uses
White Shadow, character from the animated film Turbo (film)
White Shadow, character from the animated series Minoriteam